Linsen mit Spätzle (lentils with Swabian pasta), normally accompanied by wiener sausages, is a traditional Swabian dish that is by many Swabians considered the Swabian national meal in the southwestern region of Germany.

History 
Like many dishes from the region,  originated as a meal for the poor. While meat was too expensive for the major part of the Swabian population, lentils were a popular and nutritious staple food which could be stored during winter. Lentils are also a crop that can be produced even on soils of low nutrient content in the region. The combination of wheat and egg and lentils is a good source of protein with high biological value.

Today this winter dish is on the menu of many traditional Swabian restaurants. Aside from that, it is a popular meal in company staff canteens and university cafeterias.  It is also a popular dish for cooking at home.

See also

 List of pasta dishes
 List of sausage dishes

External links (in parts German) 
Instruction in American English
 Rezept mit ausführlicher Beschreibung der Zubereitungsschritte
 Rezept mit ausführlicher Beschreibung der Zubereitungsschritte für die Linsen und hier für die Spätzle
 Verfeinertes Rezept

Swabian cuisine
Sausage dishes
Lentil dishes
Pasta dishes